Gloucester Historic District may refer to:
Central Gloucester Historic District in Gloucester, Massachusetts
Gloucester Downtown Historic District in Gloucester, Virginia
Gloucester County Courthouse Square Historic District in Gloucester, Virginia